Scutellaria holguinensis is a species of flowering plant in the family Lamiaceae, native to Cuba. It is found on serpentine soils in Holguín Province, northeastern Cuba.

References

holguinensis
Endemic flora of Cuba
Plants described in 2019